The Vice-Chancellor of the County Palatine of Lancaster is an office of the Duchy of Lancaster. The vice-chancellor is appointed by the Chancellor of the Duchy of Lancaster after consultation with the Lord High Chancellor of Great Britain. Since 1987, the vice-chancellor has been a High Court judge of the Chancery Division with a term of approximately three years.

The Vice-Chancellor of the County Palatine of Lancaster exercises general supervision over the conduct of Chancery division business in the North of England and is an ex-officio member of the court of Lancaster University.

Before the implementation of the Courts Act 1971, the appointment of the Vice-Chancellor of the County Palatine was controlled by section 14 of the Administration of Justice Act 1928 (repealed by Schedule 11, Part 2 of the Courts Act 1971). From 1973 to 1987, Andrew James Blackett-Ord, a circuit judge held the post. Since then, the office has been held by a Justice of the High Court sitting in the Chancery Division.

List of vice-chancellors
Source: Somerville, Duchy of Lancaster Office Holders, (1871 onwards): Northern Circuit
1649 and 1651 : Thomas Fell
?–?1790 : William Swinnerton (served 33 years, died 1790)
1791-1799 : James Allan Park
1800-1815: Edward King1815-1820: William David Evans1820-1822: Samuel Yate Benton1826-1844 :Francis Ludlow Holt
1849–1851 : William Page Wood 
1851–1852: Richard Bethell, 1st Baron Westbury
1853–1868 : William Milbourne James
1868–1871 : John Wickens
1871–1881 : George Little
1881–1893: Henry Fox Bristowe 
1893–1895 : William Fothergill Robinson 
1895–1905 : Sir Samuel Hall 
1905–1912 : Octavius Leigh-Clare
1912–1919 : Sir Dudley Stewart-Smith
1919–1925 : Roger Bernard Lawrence
1925–1936 : Sir (William) Courthope Townshend Wilson
1936–1948 : Sir John Bennett
1948–1963 : Sir (John) Leonard Stone
1963–1973 : Sir Thomas Burgess
1973–1987: Andrew James Blackett-Ord
Since 1987
1987–1991: Sir Richard Scott
1991–1994: Sir Andrew Morritt
1994–1999: Sir Jonathan Parker
1999–2002: Sir William Blackburne
2002–2005: Sir Timothy Lloyd
2005–2008: Sir Nicholas Patten
2008–2012: Sir David Richards
2012–2013: Sir Michael Briggs
2013-2017: Sir Alastair Norris
2017-2019: Sir Gerald Barling
2019-2021: Sir Richard Snowden
2021: Sir Timothy Fancourt

References

External links
 Duchy of Lancaster official website

Judiciary of England and Wales
Duchy of Lancaster
Ceremonial officers in the United Kingdom
Lancaster University